The 400/500 class rail motors are diesel trains built by New South Wales Government Railways primarily for use on regional lines throughout NSW. The trains have since been phased out following a rationalisation of country branch line rail services in November 1983. The 400 Class power cars were built in 1938 at the Eveleigh Carriage Workshops, while the 500 Class trailer cars were built by Ritchie Brothers at Auburn.

Power Cars
They were fitted with two underfloor  Leyland in-line six-cylinder, petrol engines coupled to Leyland Lysholm-Smith hydraulic transmissions. This was a repeat of the installation used in the earlier Rail Motor No.38. No multiple unit capability was provided. Each power car was capable of hauling one or two trailer cars.

FPH 404 was destroyed by fire at Narrandera in 1944. The remaining three were fitted with diesel engines between 1953 and 1957. They were fitted with two 150 horsepower GM Detroit Diesel  6/71 in-line six-cylinder, diesel engines and Twin Disc hydraulic torque converter transmissions.

When built, the power cars had a toilet located in the front opposite the driver and the front window was covered by a metal plate which gave the driver limited vision at level crossings. The cars had a 'one-eyed' appearance and this earned them the nickname 'Lord Nelson'. The toilet was later moved to the rear of the passenger compartment and replaced by passenger seating.

FPH 402 was modified in 1972 with the installation of a compartment seating eight First Class passengers and a toilet at the opposite end to the main passenger compartment and coded HPC. It was planned to extend this modification to 401 and 403 but with the decline in passenger numbers, it was considered too expensive to be repeated. The others simply had four seats in the main compartment allocated to First Class.

With the decline in branch line patronage, the use of trailers became rare and some were reassigned to Sydney for suburban working, while those remaining in the country received little use.

Trailer Cars
The 500 Class trailer cars were the same as those used on the Silver City Comet except that air-conditioning was not provided. The cars had two basic configurations, a composite sitting car (CT 501-504 and 506) and a Second Class sitting car (FT 505, 507 and 508). These last three were stored on completion in 1938 and finally entered service between 1941 and 1944. The trailer cars were initially delivered from the builder with Comet trailer numbers (213-220) but were renumbered into the 500 series before entering service. FT 505 was sent to Sydney to work with 42-Foot rail motors in 1951. The end doors were sealed and CPH operating equipment fitted. From 1951 onwards 501, 502, 504, 507 and 508 were fitted with a luggage compartment and coded as HCT. FT 506 and HCT 501 were later sent to Sydney and modified to work with CPH rail motors along the same lines as FT 505.

Deployment
Two units were initially deployed to Dubbo for working to Coonamble, Molong and Gwabegar and two to Narranderra for working services to Junee, Tocumwal, Hay and Hillston. The Dubbo-based units were transferred Narrandera in the early 1940s and along with Rail Motor No.38 worked the southern branches until the 1970s. The three surviving 400 Class and No.38 were then transferred to north west with units being based at Werris Creek, Narrabri and Moree, where they remained until their retirement in November 1983.

Radio Test Car
HPC 402, along with trailer FT 501, was purchased by the Rail Motor Society, Paterson in 1984. In August 1986 HPC 402 was leased back to the State Rail Authority and after an overhaul used as a radio system test unit operating across NSW. Initially for six months it would not be until July 2000 that it returned to the society after travelling 200,000 kilometres. It has continued to see regular main line use often being hired by train companies as a route learner of for executive inspections. In 2013 it performed such duties in Victoria.

Preservation
FT 503 was damaged by fire and scrapped in 1944. The surviving 400 and 500 Class were all withdrawn in November 1983. FT 505 and 506 were scrapped and HCT 507 was disposed of privately, while the remainder were offered for sale. Trailers HCT 504 and 508 and reprieved from the sale and were converted to parcel trailers for the Silver City Comet. They were painted in the Comet's distinctive silver and blue livery and recoded PT. They were withdrawn with the other Comet vehicles in 1989. HPC 401 and 403 and trailer CT 503 are preserved at the Dorrigo Steam Railway & Museum, while HPC 402 and trailer FT 501 are preserved in the collection of the Rail Motor Society. HPC 402 is the sole unit remaining in operational condition.

References

Further reading

Railcars of New South Wales